Ron Terada (born 1969) is a Vancouver-based artist working in various media, including painting, photography, video, sound, books, and graphic design.

Life and work 
Terada received his Fine Arts diploma in 1991 from Emily Carr University of Art and Design in Vancouver, British Columbia. From 1998 to 2007, he held a sessional faculty position at the same institution.

In 2006, Terada received the Victor Martyn Lynch-Staunton Award, Canada Council for the Arts. He is also a recipient of the VIVA Award, The Jack & Doris Shadbolt Foundation for the Visual Arts (2004).

Terada, who lives and works in Vancouver, often draws from past art historical figures and popular culture to reflect on familiar narratives and frequently on aspiration and failure.

His practice calls attention to existing cultural forms and their operation as signs. Past works have adapted gallery signage, posters, brochures, and exhibition soundtracks to question the statements of cultural institutions. Additionally, Terada, who is of Japanese-Canadian descent, often uses his own position within the Vancouver art world as the starting point for measuring his own self-worth, self-esteem, and self-identification.

Terada is represented by the Catriona Jeffries Gallery based in Vancouver.

Exhibitions 
While not widely known in the United States, Terada has exhibited extensively in Canada and Europe over the past 15 years.

The Museum of Contemporary Art, Chicago, holds Terada's first U.S. solo museum show titled Ron Terada: Being There November 5, 2011 – January 15, 2012.  The exhibition is curated by MCA James W. Alsdorf Chief Curator Michael Darling.

Recent solo shows include Who I Think I Am at the Walter Philips Gallery, Banff, Canada (2010). Terada has exhibited recently in the group show It Is What It Is at the National Gallery of Canada (2010).

Collections 
Terada has work in museum collections throughout Canada, as well as in Los Angeles and the United Kingdom.

 Agnes Etherington Art Centre, Queen’s University, Kingston, Ontario
 Art Gallery of Nova Scotia, Halifax, Nova Scotia
 Art Gallery of Ontario, Toronto, Ontario
 Ikon Gallery, Birmingham, UK
 Morris & Helen Belkin Art Gallery, University of British Columbia, Vancouver
 Musée d’art contemporain de Montréal, Quebec
 Museum of Contemporary Art, Los Angeles, California
 National Gallery of Canada, Ottawa, Ontario
 Vancouver Art Gallery, Vancouver, British Columbia

External links
Museum of Contemporary Art (MCA) Chicago
Catriona Jeffries Gallery
Emily Carr College of Art and Design
Ron Terada's profile at Kadist Art Foundation

References 

1969 births
Living people
Artists from Vancouver
20th-century Canadian painters
Canadian male painters
21st-century Canadian painters
Canadian photographers
Canadian video artists
Canadian contemporary painters
Canadian sound artists
20th-century Canadian male artists
21st-century Canadian male artists